Entle Protected Environment is a section of protected land near Haga Haga and the Double Mouth Nature Reserve. Off the coast is the Amathole Marine Protected Area.

History 
This  protected area was established in 2019.

See also 

 List of protected areas of South Africa

References 

Protected areas of South Africa